Kells is a village in County Kilkenny in Ireland. It is about 15 km south of Kilkenny. It is situated on high ground to the south of the Kings River.

Kells Priory, though in ruins, is one of the best preserved in Ireland.

The Cotterell family were the leading landowners in Kells in medieval times. One member of the family, Sir  John, was executed for treason in 1346. On the other hand, his cousin Walter Cotterell (who died after 1388) was a valued servant of the English Crown who frequently sat as an extra judge.

Kilree round tower and 9th century high cross, said to be the burial place of Niall Caille, is located 2 km south of Kells.

The champion racehorse Red Rum was bred at Rossenarra stud in Kells.

Olympian Michelle Smith de Bruin lives in Kells.

See also 
 List of towns and villages in Ireland

References

Towns and villages in County Kilkenny
Census towns in County Kilkenny
Articles on towns and villages in Ireland possibly missing Irish place names